Guidance is an American teen drama web series. The series was produced by AwesomenessTV for release on the go90 streaming service. The first season of Guidance was released on October 18, 2015, with the second season released between November 14 to December 9, 2016, and the third and final season released on August 29, 2017.

Overview
The first season was released on October 18, 2015 and follows Miriam (Amanda Steele) attending sessions with her guidance counselor Anna (Michelle Trachtenberg) following the public release of scandalous photos of Miriam circulating around the school. Anna then investigates who released the photos and why.

The series was renewed for a second season which was released on November 14, 2016. The second season featured an entirely new cast and storyline – Hilary (Arden Rose), an overachiever at Capital High who discovers that her perfect GPA is suffering, causing her to accuse the school's most beloved teacher of favoritism. The new guidance counselor (Erica Dasher) launches an investigation.

The series was renewed for a third season which was released on August 28, 2017. Season 3, once again, features a new cast. The third season follows Faith (Dianne Doan), who is in mourning after the death for twin sister, Grace (also played by Doan) due to a fatal hit-and-run. Meanwhile Katina (Monique Coleman), the school's guidance counselor, "attempts to facilitate a school-wide mourning session" while investigating the circumstances of Grace's death and the tarnishing of her memory.

Cast

Season 1
 Michelle Trachtenberg as Anna
 Amanda Steele as Miriam
 Taylor John Smith as Chip
 Graham Phillips as Roger
 Brooke Markham as Bridget
 Casimere Jollette as Linz
 Saidah Arrika Ekulona as Principal Walsh
 Matt Cohen as Jim

Season 2
 Erica Dasher as Alana Maynor
 Arden Rose as Hilary Lehane
 Chachi Gonzales as Brianna Wheeler
 David Gridley as Tyler James
 Ben J. Pierce as Smiley
 Leah Lewis as Liddy 
 Diamond White as Layla
 Keean Johnson as Ozo
 Ryan Rottman as Kevin Ridley
 Eric Allan Kramer as Principal John Decost

Season 3
 Monique Coleman as Katina Howard
 Dianne Doan as Faith and Grace Park-Jensen
 Meg DeAngelis as Laurin Sweeney 
 Amymarie Gaertner as Audrey March
 Megan Suri as Navi Gupta
 Crawford Collins as Scott Williams
 Marlon Young as Principal Sullivan

Episodes

Season 1 (2015)

Season 2 (2016)

Season 3 (2017)

References

External links
 

American teen drama television series
Awesomeness (company)
American teen drama web series